Highway Patrol is a 156-episode action crime drama series produced for syndication from 1955 to 1959.

Overview
Highway Patrol stars Broderick Crawford as Dan Mathews, the gruff and dedicated head of a police force in an unidentified Western state. A signature shot of the series is fedora-wearing Matthews barking rapid-fire dialogues into a radio microphone as he leans against the door of his black and white patrol car. Crawford's acting style in the series was one of studied rudeness.

Ziv Television Programs was founded by Frederick Ziv in 1948. Ten years later, Ziv TV was a major producer of 1950s and early 1960s first-run syndicated series, including Bat Masterson, The Cisco Kid, Men into Space, Science Fiction Theater, Lock-Up, Sea Hunt, and Ripcord. Crawford signed in April 1955.

Highway Patrol premiered October 3, 1955, with "Prison Break", an episode filmed April 11–13, 1955. Initial ratings were strong, the show running second to I Love Lucy.

Ziv Television Programs produced 156 episodes spanning four TV seasons, 1955–59. During the four years of its run, Highway Patrol would feature many actors who would later become successful stars in their own right, among them Stuart Whitman, Clint Eastwood, Robert Conrad, Larry Hagman, Barbara Eden, Paul Burke, Leonard Nimoy, and Ruta Lee.

Highway Patrol is famous for its location shooting around the San Fernando Valley and Simi Valley, then mostly rural. Other notable Los Angeles area locations include Griffith Park, as well as Bronson Canyon just above Hollywood. The show also filmed at railroad stations in Glendale, California, identified by a large sign; Alhambra, California; Santa Susana, California; and Chatsworth, California.

Officer uniforms are the CHP style of the day. In seasons one to three, the shoulder patch is essentially the CHP patch with "California" and "Eureka" (state motto) removed; the California bear and other California state seal elements are retained. In season four the show adopted a uniform patch that matches its patrol car emblem. Highway Patrol Chief Dan Matthews usually wears a suit and fedora.

Art Gilmore's narration gives Highway Patrol a documentary feel, but several details are never mentioned. While described as a state police agency, the actual state is never identified. It is said to be a western state which borders Mexico. A key element of the show is two-way radio communication among patrol cars and headquarters, with heavy use of police code "10-4" (meaning "acknowledged").

Star Trek creator Gene Roddenberry wrote five episodes, sometimes using the pseudonym "Robert Wesley". Future producer Quinn Martin was sound supervisor in the show's early years; style elements of "Highway Patrol" are evident in his later productions (The Untouchables, The Fugitive, Barnaby Jones, The Invaders, The FBI and The Streets of San Francisco).

When asked why the popular show ended, Crawford said, "We ran out of crimes". Crawford reportedly had had his fill of the show's hectic TV schedule (two shows per week), which had caused him to drink more heavily than ever, and he had decided to leave Highway Patrol to make films in Europe. Ziv held up Crawford's 10% share of the show's gross (some $2 million) until Crawford agreed to sign for a new Ziv pilot and TV show, King of Diamonds. After returning from Europe, Crawford signed his new contract with Ziv and later starred in King of Diamonds playing diamond insurance investigator John King. King of Diamonds lasted only one season before being canceled in 1962. Like most Ziv series, Highway Patrol repeats were syndicated for many years, sometimes with name Ten-4. In 2010, ThisTV began airing the series. In 2017, it was added to the lineup on MeTV.

Actors
The only constant regular on Highway Patrol is star Broderick Crawford as Dan Mathews. Crawford won an Academy Award for Best Actor in 1949 for All the King's Men. William Boyett became a regular in the fourth season as Sgt. Ken Williams.

In popular culture
Crawford makes a cameo in the 1977 episode "Hustle" of CHiPs, which is also about the California Highway Patrol. After chatting about Highway Patrol, Officer Jon Baker (Larry Wilcox) says, tongue-in-cheek, "they don't make TV shows like that anymore."

Crawford comes back with, "No, they sure don't."

To mark the 75th anniversary of the CHP in 2004, Los Angeles City Council Member Tom LaBonge, District 4 (which includes parts of Hollywood) asked his "Dollar a Year Man" Gary Goltz to come up with an idea. In response, Goltz created the 10-4 Day Parade which is held every October 4. Approximately 20 to 30 classic police cars from the CHP, LAPD, and many classic cop TV shows parade down Hollywood Boulevard stopping to pay tribute to Broderick Crawford's movie Star on the Walk of Fame. They are often joined by Erik Estrada, Kent McCord and other stars of classic cop TV shows. "The Star and the Car" a documentary about Goltz and his 1955 Broderick Crawford "Highway Patrol" Buick was released in 2018.  In 2019 "Broderick Crawford Starring in Highway Patrol" a book on the series written by Goltz was released.

Show's availability
All the 156 episodes are now available on DVD from the 35mm masters. The rights to all the 156 episodes are held by Ziv Television Productions' successor United Artists Television under MGM Television.  In 2010 episodes began being shown on ThisTV, a network which features classic shows and movies. In 2017, it joined the line-up on MeTV. It has also appeared on MeTV's sister network Decades.  Some episodes of Highway Patrol have been provided online via Hulu.com. MGM Home Entertainment released the first season of Highway Patrol on DVD on August 11, 2010. On April 2, 2013, TGG Direct released seasons 2, 3, and 4 on DVD.

References

External links

 Highway Patrol TV Series Site
 
 Highway Patrol Rolls Again – 10-4! DEAD LINK
 The Star and The Car Documentary
 Gary's Buick.com
 Broderick Crawford Starring in Highway Patrol Book

1955 American television series debuts
1959 American television series endings
1950s American police procedural television series
1950s American crime drama television series
Black-and-white American television shows
English-language television shows
Fictional police officers
First-run syndicated television programs in the United States
Television series by Ziv Television Programs